Chowky is a 2016 Hindi-language thriller film directed by Shekhar (Kitu) Ghosh. The film is produced by Bunty Walia and Jaspreet Singh Walia under the banner G S Entertainment Pvt Ltd. The film stars Sandhya Mridul, Raja Chaudhary and Yudhishtir Urs.

Plot 
Chowky, a suspense thriller, is a story of one night between two strangers with a lot of twists and turns. The film revolves around a criminal (Yudhistir Urs) and a sub-inspector (played by ex - NSG officer Dipanjan Chakraborty), over an eventful night, in a Chowky (police station) where fate has got the two together.

Cast 
 Sandhya Mridul
 Raja Chaudhary
 Yudhishtir Urs 
 Dipanjan Chakraborty

Music 
Composer duo Sonu Nigam - Bickram Ghosh have composed a promotional song for Chowky. They have previously composed music for Jal and Sooper Se Ooper.

Music composer duo Bapi Tutul have composed 2 songs in the film and composer Arjit Dutta has composed 1 song in the film.

Singer Sunidhi Chauhan has sung a song in the film titled Khanjar Ki Dhar.

Soundtrack

References 

2016 films
2010s Hindi-language films